The Gardener’s Son is a screenplay by American novelist Cormac McCarthy. It is the first published screenplay written by McCarthy. It is based around a strange murder in Graniteville, South Carolina in 1876 that is without many details. The story focuses on a young man embittered by the changes in his community due to the capitalist ways of the owner of the town's cotton mill. His anger grows until his rage consumes both himself and the families caught up in it.

At the request of director Richard Pearce, McCarthy wrote the screenplay for a two-hour episode of the television series Visions that was broadcast by PBS on January 6, 1977. The episode was nominated for two Emmy awards and the screenplay has gone on to be published in book form.

Background
In 1974, Richard Pearce reached Cormac McCarthy and asked him to write the screenplay for an episode of Visions, a television drama series. Beginning in early 1975, and armed with only "a few photographs in the footnotes to a 1928 biography of a famous pre-Civil War industrialist William Gregg as inspiration," he and McCarthy spent a year traveling the South in order to research the subject matter. Much of this research and McCarthy's correspondence while writing are currently collected in the Wittliff collections. According to the guide to the collection, The Gardener's Son is his "only title with a subseries devoted to research." McCarthy completed the screenplay in 1976 and the episode was aired on January 6, 1977. It was also shown in numerous film festivals abroad.

Plot summary

Act one
William Gregg, the owner of The Graniteville Manufacturing Company and patriarch of the Gregg family, is near death. After a visit by Dr. Perceval, he and Marina Gregg, wife of William, go to see Robert McEvoy, the son of Patrick McEvoy, a worker at the mill who tends the gardens. Robert has a broken leg due to an accident which may have been the fault of James Gregg, William’s son. Robert is convinced by Mrs. Gregg to have surgery to remove the leg, which demonstrates the “quasi-familial” relationship between owners and workers at the mill under the command of William.

When William Gregg passes away, James takes over the mill and is not as sympathetic to his workers and leaves many of them unemployed without remorse. Robert's hatred for the mill and James continues to grow while he is recovering and he wishes to return to the farm his family once owned. He leaves Graniteville as an act of rebellion against James and the changes he has made to the mill.

Act two
Two years later, Robert returns after hearing word of his mother's illness but he is too late and finds her being buried on the same property as the mill. This angers him because as he says, "She don't belong to the mill." He goes on to find the mill even worse than he left it. His father has been assigned to work in a factory, leaving the once beautiful gardens to turn to weeds. Robert is angry at the capitalist behavior of James and the awful treatment of the workers. While searching for his father in order to discuss the burial of Mrs. McEvoy, he happens upon James in the mill's offices. After a heated conversation, he shoots and kills Gregg. At once, the factory goes silent, "as if Robert has shot the factory itself, the very system, in the abdomen, bringing capitalism's exploitation of its workers to a temporary halt." Many citizens believe Robert's actions to be because of James’s rumored bribe and seduction of Robert’s sister, Martha, when they were younger, though she claims that he is not aware of the incident. Nobody is ever able to determine Robert's motives and he is unable to speak in order to defend himself or expose the true character of James. Robert remains this way and continues to be an outsider to the community until he is hanged as a punishment for his crime.

Characters

Greggs
William Gregg, owner of the cotton mill and head of the Gregg family. He is known for his compassion and concern for his workers' well-being.
James Gregg, son of William Gregg. He is not as caring as his father and grows into a ruthless owner of the mill.
Marina Gregg, wife of William Gregg.

McEvoys
Patrick McEvoy, father of the McEvoys. He tends the gardens of the mill until James gains control and forces him to abandon them and work in a factory line. His acceptance of this without any fight is disheartening to Robert.
Robert McEvoy, son of Patrick McEvoy. While recovering from his leg injury, his hatred for the cotton mill and James Gregg grows until he becomes angry enough to leave Graniteville. When he returns to find what James has done to the mill and the town, he is overwhelmed and lashes out at James.
Martha McEvoy, sister of Robert and daughter of Patrick McEvoy. She is rumored to have been bribed and seduced by James.

Themes
Like many other McCarthy's other works, The Gardener's Son highlights the violence and ugliness that can be exposed in people. Also, Robert McEvoy is misunderstood and spends a large portion of the movie without one or both of his parents in his life, much like other protagonists in McCarthy's works. J. Douglas Canfield, deceased professor of English at the University of Arizona, wrote in support of the presence of an Oedipus complex in Robert McEvoy. He sees James's relationship to Robert and vice versa as "a twin brother of sorts, for they are sons of twinned patriarchs." Robert's return to Graniteville and his attempt to right the wrongs of the town show his acceptance as the role of a surrogate patriarch. However, after he eliminates the problem of James and returns to be punished by the very system that he wanted to correct, he loses this role and is left empty and "impotent."

Adaptation
Richard Pearce's adaption of McCarthy's script was aired on the television program Visions on January 6, 1977. Visions was a drama series on PBS that aired mostly unrelated teleplays directed and written by various directors and writers. It aired 29 episodes over for four seasons between 1976 and 1980. The Gardener's Son is the 12th episode of the first season.

The film starred Ned Beatty as Pinky (a citizen of Graniteville), Kevin Conway as James Gregg, and Brad Dourif as Robert McEvoy.

Awards
The Visions episode was nominated for two primetime Emmy awards in 1977. Graphic designer Gene Piotrowsky was nominated for Outstanding Achievement in Graphic Design and Title Sequences and lighting directors Leard Davis and Ken Dettling were nominated for Outstanding Achievement in Lighting Direction. Editor Roy Stewart was the winner for Outstanding Achievement in Video Tape Editing for a Series for the 1977 season of Visions.

References

External links
 
 More information on Graniteville, South Carolina Research collection from Richard Pearce

Films with screenplays by Cormac McCarthy
1996 books
Cotton production